Jazz is the seventh album by Ry Cooder, produced by Joseph Byrd and Ry Cooder and released on the Warner Bros. Records label.

Track listing
LP side A
"Big Bad Bill (Is Sweet William Now)" (Milton Ager, Jack Yellen) – 3:34
"Face to Face That I Shall Meet Him" (Traditional; adapted by Joseph Spence) – 3:16
"The Pearls / Tia Juana" (Jelly Roll Morton; adapted by Ry Cooder) – 4:18
"The Dream" (Jack the Bear, Jess Pickett) – 5:03
"Happy Meeting in Glory" (Traditional; adapted by Joseph Spence) – 3:13
LP side B
"In a Mist" (Bix Beiderbecke) – 2:05
"Flashes" (Bix Beiderbecke) – 2:17
"Davenport Blues" (Bix Beiderbecke) – 2:01
"Shine" (Cecil Mack, Ford Dabney) – 3:43 
"Nobody" (Bert Williams) – 5:07
"We Shall Be Happy" (Traditional; adapted by Joseph Spence) – 3:13

Charts

Personnel

Ry Cooder – guitar, Dobro, vocals, mandolin, tiple, harp 
Mark Stevens – drums (A1, A2, A4, A5, B4, B6)
Harvey Pittel – alto saxophone, clarinet (A1, B1, B3, B4)
Tom Collier – marimba, vibraphone (A4, B1, B3, B4)
George Bohanon – baritone horn (A2, A5, B6)
Oscar Brashear – cornet (A2, A5, B6)
Stuart Brotman – cimbalom (A2, A5, B6)
Red Callender – tuba (A2, A5, B6)
David Lindley – mandobanjo, mandolin (A2, A5, B6)
Barbara Starkey – pump organ (A2, A5, B6)
David Sherr – bass clarinet (B1, B3, B4)
John Rodby – piano (A1, B4)
Tom Pedrini – bass (B1, B3)
Jimmy Adams – backing vocals (B4, B5)
Cliff Givens – backing vocals (B4, B5)
Bill Johnson – backing vocals (B4, B5)
Simon Pico Payne – backing vocals (B4, B5)
Randy Aldcroft – trombone (A1)
Pat Rizzo – alto saxophone (A1)
Mario Guarneri – cornet (A1)
Bill Hood – bass saxophone (A1)
Chuck Domanico – bass (A4)
Earl Hines – piano (A4)
Chuck Berghofer – bass (B4)
Willie Schwartz – clarinet (B4)

References

1978 albums
Ry Cooder albums
Warner Records albums
Covers albums
Albums produced by Ry Cooder